Yankton may refer to:

People
 Yankton Dakota, division of the Dakota people, sometimes referred to as Yankton

Places
 Yankton County, South Dakota
 Yankton, South Dakota
 Yankton, Oregon

Other
 Lake Yankton, a lake in Minnesota
 Yankton College, a small liberal arts college in Yankton, South Dakota